The Rose Foundation for Communities and the Environment is an American grantmaking, research, and advocacy non-profit based in Oakland, California. Founded in 1992, it has been rated a four-star charity by Charity Navigator and is a 1% for the Planet recipient.

References

External links
 Official website

Organizations based in Oakland, California
Organizations established in 1992
Environmental organizations based in California
Environmental organizations based in the United States
1992 establishments in the United States